The Miss Brazil 2007 pageant took place April 14, 2007, in the Vivo Rio concert house in Rio de Janeiro. Each state and the Federal District competed for the title, won by Natália Guimarães of Minas Gerais. The winner would go to be First runner up at Miss Universe 2007. Miss Brasil Internacional would represent Brazil at Miss International 2007. Miss Brasil Cont. Americano would enter in Miss Continente Americano 2007.

Results

 Top 10 Semifinalists:

 Top 15 semifinalists:

Special Awards
 Miss Internet - Jakeline Lemke
 Miss Congeniality - Wilma Gomes
 Miss Photogenic - Vivian Noronha
 Best National Costume - Carla Helena

Delegates

 - Angélyca dos Santos Sampaio
 - Camilla Reis 
 - Carla Helena Melo 
 - Priscila Rilker 
 - Renata Marzolla
 - Raphaella Benevides 
 - Rafaela Studart 
 - Jackeline Lemke
 - Liandra Schmidt
 - Maiara Bentevi 
 - Juliana Simon Florêncio 
 - Eigla Oliveira 
 - Natália Aparecida Guimarães
 - Naiane Figueiredo Alves 
 - Roberta Guerra 
 - Vivian Noronha Cia
 - Wilma Gomes 
 - Amanda Costa 
 - Aiana Soares
 - Kallyne Freire 
 - Carolina Prattes Néry
 - Iaísa Ribeiro 
 - Monnya Leite 
 - Manoella Heiderscheidt 
 - Sabrina Rhoden 
 - Paloma Vieira de Melo 
 - Jaqueline Moura

Trivia
Vivian Noronha would enter Miss Brazil World 2008 and would be Miss Hispano Brasil representing Brazil at Reina Hispanoamericana 2008. She was first runner up and then the winner was dethroned she became the new winner and first runner-up at Miss Tourism Queen International 2009.

External links
 Official site (in Portuguese)
 Miss News (multilingual)

2007
2007 in Brazil
2007 beauty pageants